Hanoi–Lào Cai Railway is a  railway line serving northern Vietnam. It is a single-track metre gauge line connecting Hanoi with Lào Cai, on the China-Vietnam border in Lào Cai Province. It is the Vietnamese section of the metre gauge Kunming–Haiphong railway.

At the border, the Hanoi - Lào Cai railway connects with Kunming–Hekou railway of China.

References

See also 
 List of railway lines in Vietnam

Railway lines in Vietnam
Metre gauge railways in Vietnam
Transport in Vietnam
Articles containing video clips